St. Stanislaus Kostka College is a private Catholic primary and secondary school and vocational training centre, located in the neighborhood of El Palo in the East District of Málaga, in the autonomous community of Andalusia, Spain. The school was founded by the Society of Jesus in 1882.

Notable alumni 

 Manuel Altolaguirre
 José Ortega y Gasset
 José María Souvirón
 José Moreno Villa

See also

 Catholic Church in Spain
 Education in Spain
 List of Jesuit schools

References

Bibliography 
 Soto Artunedo, Wenceslao. The Jesuit College of St Stanislaus of Kostka.  Malaga: Loyola Foundation. 2007. 
 Calvo Serrano, José Maria. Colegio San Estanislao. Notas para su historia. Málaga, 1982.

Jesuit secondary schools in Spain
Jesuit primary schools in Spain
Vocational education in Spain
Schools in Andalusia
Educational institutions established in 1882
1882 establishments in Spain
Buildings and structures in Málaga